This is a list of the Aghas of the Janissaries, the commanders of the Janissary corps from the early 16th century to the early 19th century.

References

Sources
 

Janissaries
Janissary Aghas
Aghas Janissaries